Star Trek: Strange New Worlds is an American television series created by Akiva Goldsman, Alex Kurtzman, and Jenny Lumet for the streaming service Paramount+. It is the eleventh Star Trek series and was launched in 2022 as part of Kurtzman's expanded Star Trek Universe. A spin-off from Star Trek: Discovery, it follows Captain Christopher Pike and the crew of the starship USS Enterprise as they explore new worlds throughout the galaxy during the decade before Star Trek: The Original Series.

Anson Mount, Ethan Peck, and Rebecca Romijn respectively star as Pike, Spock, and Number One, all characters from The Original Series. These actors were cast in the roles for the second season of Discovery, and were confirmed to be returning for the spin-off in May 2020. Jess Bush, Christina Chong, Celia Rose Gooding, Melissa Navia, Babs Olusanmokun, and Bruce Horak also star. Many of the regular actors and several guest stars portray younger versions of characters from The Original Series in Strange New Worlds.

The following list includes the main cast of Strange New Worlds, all guest characters with recurring roles, and a supplementary list of other guests.

Overview
<onlyinclude>
  = Main cast (credited) 
  = Recurring cast (3+)
  = Guest cast (1-2)

Main characters

Christopher Pike

Christopher "Chris" Pike (portrayed by Anson Mount) is the captain of the USS Enterprise, who struggles with the knowledge that he will suffer a horrible fate. Pike was first portrayed by Jeffrey Hunter in The Original Series as a "gruff, authoritative commander" who Mount described as "first act Pike... a very young man [who is] very self-involved". In contrast, Mount's "second act Pike" is confident, collaborative, and empathetic. Co-showrunner Akiva Goldsman believed that a "more thoughtful and contemporary approach" was required to avoid the toxic masculinity of some previous Star Trek captains, and Mount said his Pike represented "true masculinity". Inspired by Mount's own leadership style, Pike's quarters include a kitchen where he convenes the crew, cooks for them, and builds consensus. Pike's hairstyle was widely commented on, drawing comparisons to Elvis Presley and the title character of the animated series Johnny Bravo, spawning various Internet memes and its own fan-run Twitter account, and being called "the best hair quiff on television". Mount enjoyed this and attributed the style to "hair guru" Daniel Losco.

Spock

Spock (portrayed by Ethan Peck) is a half-Vulcan, half-human science officer aboard the Enterprise. The series explores the character's struggle to be accepted among Vulcans as well as the complicated relationship with his fiancée T'Pring, with co-showrunner Henry Alonso Myers acknowledging that the writers were interpreting some of The Original Series differently than fans had previously done in order to expand on T'Pring's role in this stage of Spock's life. Peck said he was "constantly checking in" with original actor Leonard Nimoy's portrayal of Spock, but he also wanted to "have an experience as Spock" and not focus on the outcome for the character.

Christine Chapel

Christine Chapel (portrayed by Jess Bush) is a civilian nurse on the Enterprise. Myers felt the character's portrayal in The Original Series came from a "very different conception of women and of marriage and what people would do in their jobs" that modern audiences would not expect, and sought to tell new stories inspired by Bush's strengths. Bush said the character had a "distinct essence" but also felt there was room to explore her youth and backstory; the actress focused on the character's "dry and sarcastic" personality and developed that into a sense of humor for the younger version. The series explores a friendship and potential romance between Chapel and Spock.

La'an Noonien-Singh
La'an Noonien-Singh (portrayed by Christina Chong) is the Enterprise newly assigned chief of security, whose family was murdered by the lizard-like Gorn when she was a child. Chong described the character as guarded and struggling with survivor's guilt but noted that she opens up as the series goes on and the crew of the Enterprise becomes her new family. Serving as security chief allows her to protect that family. La'an is also a descendant of Ricardo Montalbán's Star Trek villain Khan Noonien Singh, and has been discriminated against because of this. Chong related to this aspect of the character because she was bullied as a child for her ethnicity. Ava Cheung plays young La'an.

Nyota Uhura

Nyota Uhura (portrayed by Celia Rose Gooding) is a cadet on the Enterprise specializing in linguistics. Despite the character's important role throughout the Star Trek franchise, the writers felt that there was a lot still unknown about her that could be explored beyond her just being a Starfleet officer. As one of her first television acting roles, Gooding related to Uhura's experiences in the series as a cadet who is learning about the Enterprise. The actress chose to keep her own cropped hair rather than wear a wig to match previous Uhura actresses Nichelle Nichols and Zoe Saldaña because she felt they both represented the "black femininity" of their times and she could too with a modern look.

Erica Ortegas
Erica Ortegas (portrayed by Melissa Navia) is the Enterprise helmsman, who Navia described as a "highly skilled pilot [and] a veteran... she can handle a gun and also crack a joke". The actress compared Ortegas to Jonathan Frakes's Next Generation character William Riker, one of her favorite Star Trek characters. Navia worked with John Van Citters—the vice president of Star Trek brand management at CBS Studios—and the series' motion graphics team, who create the display for Ortegas's on-set control panel, to understand how to fly the Enterprise accurately. Ortegas's surname is a reference to the original Star Trek pitch which included a navigator named Jose Ortegas.

Joseph M'Benga

Joseph M'Benga (portrayed by Babs Olusanmokun) is the Enterprise chief medical officer, who is secretly trying to cure his daughter, Rukiya, of a rare disease. M'Benga was not given a first name in The Original Series, but was referred to as Joseph in the script for the unproduced episode "Shol". Posters at the 2022 Star Trek: Mission Chicago convention referred to the character as "Jabilo", a name used in some non-canon novels, but the producers soon stated that this was incorrect and the name Joseph was eventually used in Strange New Worlds. Olusanmokun felt he was "crafting something anew" with his portrayal since M'Benga only appears in two episodes of The Original Series.

Hemmer
Hemmer (portrayed by Bruce Horak; season 1) is the Enterprise chief engineer. Hemmer is an Aenar, which are an albino subspecies of Andorians that are generally depicted as blind; Horak is blind in one eye with limited sight in the other, and the first legally blind regular actor in a Star Trek series. The writers always intended for Hemmer to die in the first season as a way to increase the series' stakes since most of the main characters are still alive in The Original Series. Horak was told about this when he was first cast and hoped to build the character into a "fan favorite" first. He compared the role to the Star Wars character Obi-Wan Kenobi, serving as a mentor to the young Uhura.

Number One

Una Chin-Riley / Number One (portrayed by Rebecca Romijn) is the first officer of the Enterprise and second-in-command to Pike, the character was only referred to as "Number One" in The Original Series but was given the name Una Chin-Riley in several non-canon Star Trek novels; Strange New Worlds brings this name into official canon. The series confirms that Number One is an Illyrian, which Original Series writer D.C. Fontana had established in the novel Vulcan's Glory (1989), and reveals that Illyrians genetically modify themselves. This explains why Number One appears human when the Illyrians seen in the Star Trek: Enterprise episode "Damage" do not, and also aligns with the description of Illyrians practicing "selective breeding" in the novel Child of Two Worlds by Greg Cox. The Strange New Worlds writers believed it would be interesting for Number One to be at odds with Starfleet's anti-genetic alteration laws.

Recurring characters

Robert April

Robert April (portrayed by Adrian Holmes) is a Starfleet admiral and the Enterprise's first captain who is a mentor to Pike.

Sam Kirk
George Samuel "Sam" Kirk (portrayed by Dan Jeannotte) is a life sciences officer aboard the Enterprise and elder brother to future captain James T. Kirk. Myers said Sam and James were very different and the series would explore their complex relationship.

T'Pring

T'Pring (portrayed by Gia Sandhu) is Spock's fiancée, with whom he has been bonded since childhood. Myers said the character was "fun, and thoughtful, and interesting", and allowed Spock to be explored in new ways.

Batel
Batel (portrayed by Melanie Scrofano) is a Starfleet captain and Pike's "friend with benefits".

James T. Kirk

James Tiberius Kirk (portrayed by Paul Wesley; season 2, guest season 1) is Sam's younger brother and the future captain of the Enterprise.

Guest characters 
 A leader on Kiley 279 (portrayed by Samantha Smith).
 Alora (portrayed by Lindy Booth) is a leader on Majalis who is an old flame of Pike's.
 The First Servant (portrayed by Ian Ho) is a boy on Majalis who was selected at birth to be sacrificed to the machine that runs the paradise-like planet.
 Gamal (portrayed by Huse Madhavji) is the biological father of the First Servant who tries to save his son from the Majalis machine.
 Angel (portrayed by Jesse James Keitel) is a pirate captain and the lover of Spock's half-brother Sybok.

References

Star Trek: Strange New Worlds
Lists of Star Trek people
Star Trek characters